The Embassy of the State of Palestine in Azerbaijan is the diplomatic mission of the Palestine in Azerbaijan. It is located in Baku.

See also

Azerbaijan–Palestine relations
List of diplomatic missions in Azerbaijan.
List of diplomatic missions of Palestine.

References

Diplomatic missions of the State of Palestine
Diplomatic missions in Baku
Azerbaijan–State of Palestine relations